Nicholas E. Hinch (1869–1961) was a Canadian-American professor of English and an American football and basketball coach. He was an 1898 graduate of the University of Toronto. He was instrumental in founding the English department at State Normal School at Cheney–now known as Eastern Washington University–in Cheney, Washington. Hinch served the head football coach at Cheney Normal in 1908 and 1912, compiling a record of 2–4. He was also the school's head basketball coach for one season, in 1905–06, tallying a mark of 3–6.

Head coaching record

Football

References

External links
 

1869 births
1961 deaths
Eastern Washington Eagles football coaches
Eastern Washington Eagles men's basketball coaches
Eastern Washington University faculty
University of Toronto alumni
Canadian emigrants to the United States